Lanfranco Mignoti (Piode, 16th century – 17th century) was an Italian mathematician.

Born in Piode in Valsesia, he gave a relevant contribution to hydraulic engineering.

Works

References 

17th-century deaths
16th-century births
Hydraulic engineering
16th-century Italian mathematicians
17th-century Italian mathematicians